As You Are is an Australian television play which aired in 1958 on ABC. The play was telecast live in Melbourne and kinescoped for showing in Sydney (these were the only two Australian cities with TV at the time).

Plot
An underwear salesman from northern England becomes involved with a confidence man from the Continent.

Cast
Paul Bacon
Georgina Batterham
Max Bruch
Agnes Dobson
Laurie Lange
George Ogilvie
Fred Parslow

Production
The play starred Paul Bacon an English actor living in Australia.

See also
 List of live television plays broadcast on Australian Broadcasting Corporation (1950s)

References

External links
 As You Are on IMDb

1958 television plays
1950s Australian television plays
Australian Broadcasting Corporation original programming
English-language television shows
Black-and-white Australian television shows
Australian live television shows
1950s English-language films